Jakob Arthur (born 27 September 2002) is an Australian professional rugby league footballer who plays as a  or  for the Parramatta Eels in the NRL.

Background
He is the son of Eels head coach Brad Arthur and is a halfback for the Parramatta Eels. He grew up playing for the Rouse Hill Rhinos as a Parramatta junior.

Playing career

2021
In round 10 of the 2021 NRL season, Arthur made his first grade debut for Parramatta against the New Zealand Warriors at Suncorp Stadium, scoring a try in a 34–18 win in the Magic Round.
In December 2021, Arthur signed a new deal to remain at Parramatta until the end of the 2023 season.

2022
In round 8 of the 2022 NRL season, Arthur was controversially put at five-eighth ahead of the established Dylan Brown for Parramatta's match against North Queensland.  North Queensland would end up winning the match 35-4.  Arthur was subsequently demoted to the NSW Cup for the following week.
In July, Arthur was booed by some sections of the Parramatta fan base before the clubs match against Brisbane at the Western Sydney Stadium.
In round 21 of the 2022 NRL season, Arthur was called into the Parramatta side after Mitchell Moses was ruled out for five weeks with a broken finger.  Arthur provided two assists in the game as Parramatta won 36-20 against Manly.
Arthur was controversially retained on the interchange bench for Parramatta throughout the 2022 finals series.  In Parramatta's upset preliminary final victory over North Queensland, Arthur was an unused substitute in the clubs 24-20 victory.  In the 2022 NRL Grand Final, Arthur came onto the field with five minutes remaining and Penrith leading the match 28-0.  Parramatta would score two late tries including Arthur scoring a try just before the full-time siren.
On 7 October, Arthur signed a two-year contract extension to remain at Parramatta until the end of 2024.

References

External links
Parramatta Eels profile
Zero Tackle profile
Jakob & The Beanstalk – Can The Son Of Arthur Reach The Summit?
Rugby League Project

2002 births
Living people
Australian rugby league players
Parramatta Eels players
Rugby league five-eighths
Rugby league halfbacks
Rugby league players from Cairns